Matthew Loveland Dennis (February 11, 1914 – June 21, 2002) was an American singer, pianist, band leader, arranger, and writer of music for popular songs.

Biography
Dennis was born in Seattle, Washington, United States. His mother was a violinist and his father a singer, and the family was in vaudeville, so he was exposed to music early. In 1933 he joined Horace Heidt's orchestra as a vocalist and pianist. Later on, he formed his own band, with Dick Haymes as vocalist. He became vocal coach, arranger, and accompanist for Martha Tilton, and worked with a new vocal group, The Stafford Sisters. Jo Stafford, one of the sisters, joined the Tommy Dorsey band in 1940 and persuaded Dorsey to hire Dennis as arranger and composer. Dennis wrote prolifically, with 14 of his songs recorded by the Dorsey band in one year alone, including "Everything Happens to Me", an early hit for Frank Sinatra.

After four years in the United States Air Force in World War II, Dennis returned to music writing and arranging, getting a boost from his old friend Dick Haymes, who hired him to be the music director for his radio program. With lyricist Tom Adair he wrote songs for Haymes' program.

Dennis made six albums, which were out of print for many years; however, his 1953 song "Angel Eyes" (with lyricist Earl Brent) has become a frequently recorded jazz standard; less frequently recorded, but notably by Miles Davis and Sonny Rollins is "Will You Still Be Mine". Pianist Dave Brubeck and his quartet recorded an entire album of Dennis's compositions, released as Angel Eyes in 1965.

In 2012, Jasmine Records re-released four of Dennis' records as "Welcome Matt". The collection included "Plays and Sings Matt Dennis", a 1958 live performance by Dennis' piano trio, of twelve tunes that Dennis had co-authored.

Dennis died in Riverside, California, at the age of 88.

Songs with music by Matt Dennis
 "Angel Eyes"
 "Compared to You"
 "Everything Happens to Me" 
 "It Wasn't the Stars"
 "Junior and Julie"
 "Let's Get Away from It All"
 "Little Man with a Candy Cigar"
 "Love Turns Winter to Spring"
 "Show Me the Way to Get Out of This World"
 "The Night We Called It a Day"
 "Violets for Your Furs"
 "Will You Still Be Mine"

References

External links
 Biography of Matt Dennis
 Matt Dennis and Angel Eyes

RCA Victor artists
1914 births
2002 deaths
20th-century American singers
United States Army Air Forces personnel of World War II
American male songwriters
Musicians from Seattle
Songwriters from Washington (state)
Singers from Washington (state)
20th-century American composers
20th-century American male musicians